The NR class are a class of Australian diesel locomotive built by A Goninan & Co for National Rail between 1996 and 1998. They are currently operated by Pacific National. The C44aci model locomotives built by UGL Rail at Broadmeadow adopted the design from the NR Class.

History

When National Rail commenced operations in April 1993, it inherited a diverse collection of rolling stock and locomotives from various operators to operate interstate freight services in Australia. The fleet included locomotives of mixed age and power, leased from FreightCorp, V/Line and Australian National.

In September 1995, National Rail awarded a contract to A Goninan & Co for 80 locomotives, which later became 120. NR1–NR60 were built at Broadmeadow, and NR61–NR120 were constructed at Bassendean. The frames were built at Hexham and the bogies at Goninan's Landsdowne Engineering subsidiary in Taree.

The first locomotive to be completed was NR61, which was trialled on 18 September 1996, between Midland and Jumperkine. The first Broadmeadow-built unit ran on 23 September 1996. The early units were delivered without National Rail branding or logos, but later locomotives were delivered in the full livery. Testing was carried out on the NSW Main Northern line between Werris Creek and Maitland, using ballast wagons and 442 class locomotives, in dynamic braking mode, as dynamic loads. Each locomotive was required to accumulate  of trouble-free running before being accepted. The final unit was delivered from Broadmeadow in February 1998.

Pacific National announced in September 2022 that the company had committed more than A$160M towards the overhauling of the company's NR class units.

Class list

 As part of its contract, A Goninan & Co was required to maintain the fleet. A depot was built alongside the Newport to Sunshine railway in the western Melbourne suburb of Spotswood cater for this.

Entry to service
With the arrival of the class, National Rail was able to return leased units to their respective owners, including 422, 80, 81, and 82 class locomotives to FreightCorp, and 442s and 48s class locomotives to Silverton Rail.

The V/Line C class (which were owned by National Rail) and relatively new EL class were withdrawn and stored. Once all 120 units were delivered, National Rail retained the AN, BL and DL class locomotives, along with thirteen 81 class and several hired G class. The new locomotives were placed on time sensitive trains first.

When first delivered, the NR class were banned from running in New South Wales by the Environment Protection Authority due to excessive noise when under dynamic braking but the ban was lifted after further testing. The class could also not lead on the Victorian standard gauge network due to the lack of suitable radio equipment. In later years NR76 to NR98 were provided with V/Line Section Authority System equipment to work the Western standard gauge line, while NR1 to NR13 and NR61 to NR72 were fitted with V/Line radios to operate on the Victorian North East line.

Great Southern Rail contracted National Rail to haul its services, the first train running with NR77 on 1 November 1997. All were included in the sale of National Rail to Pacific National in February 2002.

Accidents

The NR Class locomotives have travelled millions of Kilometres across Australia, and over time have been involved in several accidents with varying levels of severity, a handful of noteworthy examples are included below.

NR3 was involved in an accident with a collapsed bridge at Robertson while hauling a Steel train that resulted in fatalities to the two train drivers; it was rebuilt and renumbered as NR121 out of respect.

In late May 2006, NR33 was involved in a level crossing incident at Lismore, being the third locomotive on Melbourne to Adelaide freight service AM3, behind DL40 and NR52. A truck drove into the side of the NR during low visibility conditions and the subsequent accident saw approximately 1200 metres of the train land on top of NR33, the NR was subsequently written off and scrapped in Bendigo after an inspection to see how viable a return to service would be. 

On 30 January 2009, train 5PS6 derailed at a washaway near Golden Ridge, just east of Kalgoorlie in Western Australia. Locomotives NR35 and NR51 finished up on their sides, badly damaged, and spent several years out of service before the decision was made to repair them.

On 3 April 2016, NR8 was involved in a engine fire at Cardiff, NSW. The locomotive was rebuilt during 2016. NRs 48 and 81 had suffered similar fires several years earlier, both also were repaired but without the Pacific National signage on their hood sides.

On 21 April 2016, train 3MP5 derailed near Rawlinna in Western Australia. The two locomotives, NR34 and NR50, were badly damaged, but both were rebuilt and returned to service in late 2016/mid 2017 respectively.

On 24 December 2019, 7MP5 hauled by NR80/NR59 collided with the rear of 2K66 Watco/CBH grain train, at Jumperkine, Western Australia, which resulted in the driver passing away. NR59 was later forwarded back to Melbourne, while NR80 was rebuilt at UGL Bassendean, being released as NR122 during early 2021.

On 25 February 2021, 4BM4 hauled by NR43/AN3/NR39 derailed at Nana Glen due to track washaway from extensive flooding. NR43/AN3 stayed on the tracks while NR39 ended up on its side, with half the train derailing behind it. NR39 was repaired and repainted later in the year.

Features
The NR Class introduced many new features. These were the first locomotives in Australia to have "variable horsepower", which meant that the power output of the engine had three different settings, making the NR class the most fuel-efficient locomotives in Australia.

The NR Class cab was designed taking into consideration the results of an extended consultative process with the end users. This has resulted in a cab that has been well accepted. The layout of the control stand evolved from a British Rail Class 60 cab, and is substantially different from the more common AAR type I (stand) and Type II (desk) cabs.

The design is a long hood unit locomotive, with only one cab but two separate sets of controls, which allow it be driven either "A" or "B" end leading. This locomotive had to pass all tests, such as being able to shunt if required, drive "long end leading" if needed, and allow drivers to do checks on fuel, brakes, and sand. Despite the twin controls, operation of the class "B" end leading is avoided, with single NR classes being turned on turntables to ensure they face the correct way.

In 2013, UGL Rail, Spotswood fitted NR17 with ECP/WDP braking systems for use on quarry traffic in New South Wales. It was reclassified as NRE17 during December of that year, but that code was reverted very quickly and  more recent photos indicate the normal code. The cabside decals of NR120 were also altered to permit addition of the "E", but there is no evidence that this ever happened.

Liveries
The entire NR fleet was delivered in the original National Rail Livery.

With Pacific National ownership changes were made, the Pacific National decals placed over the side air deflectors replacing the National Rail signage. From 2006 the National Rail diamonds on the side and ends of the locomotives were removed or painted over. All have now been repainted into Pacific National livery.

Some have been repainted into special liveries:
NR18, NR74, NR75 & NR109 in Red The Ghan livery
NR25, 26, 27, 28, 29 & 86 in Blue & Yellow Indian Pacific livery.
NR14,NR66 & NR84 in a modified Pacific National promotional livery "Real Trains, not Road Trains"
NR34 in a special indigenous wrap, over it's promotional livery.
NR31 & NR30 in Great Southern orange livery.
NR52 in a modified Pacific National livery RUOK.
NR1, NR17, NR20, NR22, NR36, NR39, NR45, NR48, NR50, NR55, NR56, NR59, NR61, NR85, NR93, NR96, NR101, NR112, NR121 & NR122 in the now standard PN Blue & yellow livery with 5 stars. Most of these paint jobs are being completed at Islington Workshops. 

There was a proposal in 2011 to repaint some locomotives into new passenger liveries, with two locomotives each for the Indian Pacific, the Ghan and the Overland. NR18 was repainted in 2011 using a yellow and grey variant of the Southern Spirit's green and white livery. It was scheduled to be followed by NR76 in a new Ghan livery before the program was put on indefinite hold, and that engine returned to service in the standard Pacific National scheme. The Ghan scheme was likely a further palette swap to red and orange, and marketing materials from the era imply that the Overland scheme might have been a blue version.

Model railways
Models of the NR Class locomotive have been available since June 2000. Austrains used the engine as a way to open up the then-modern era as a practical option for modelling Australian railways, and to date it is one of the highest-selling models in the Australian model railway market. Austrains was not able to obtain permission to recreate the Indigenous liveries as applied to NR30 and NR52, so in the second run they released the two engines with their respective short-lived grey and black schemes, to provide an undercoat base and allow customers to apply those liveries themselves either with paint or decals.

The model was significantly re-engineered following the sixth run, and re-released in September 2009. Engines of runs seven and above include speaker enclosures within the chassis, working marker and ditch lights (with a manual switch under the fuel tank) and a modified coupler attachment system with the coupler box opening filled in. Austrains was also involved in the production of non-motored NR class models in N scale, sold to guests on Great Southern Rail's services as souvenirs.

Austrains sold all their tooling to SDS Models in 2015, and the new owners announced that some older models would be re-released under the "Austrains Neo" brand. One of those releases included the NR class, using the most recent tooling but without the motor fitted, to allow modellers to run trains with more than one or two engines on the front, at a reasonable price. Early 2017 saw the announcement of a new run of powered units.
In 2020, SDS released their own run of the NR's featuring new liveries previously not done before, mainly NR18 in "The Ghan" as well as NR's 30 and 31 in the "Great Southern" livery. 

In 2015, Auscision Models announced their intent to release a run of NR class locomotives, starting the design from scratch. These models were released in 2021.

In more recent times, Frateschi has released rough approximations of the NR class in Ghan and Indian Pacific liveries, as part of cheap starter sets including three passenger or freight carriages.

References

Bibliography

External links
NR class database at Railpage

Co-Co locomotives
Diesel locomotives of Australia
Pacific National diesel locomotives
Railway locomotives introduced in 1996
Standard gauge locomotives of Australia
General Electric locomotives